Rana Colony is a small town in Gujranwala District in the Punjab province of Pakistan.

Rana Colony has a population of over approximately 5,000 and is located along the Grand Trunk Road passing through the city of Gujranwala. The population is over 99% Muslim. Most people in the town speak Punjabi, though almost all of them can also speak national language of Pakistan, Urdu. English is spoken by educated elite.

Cities and towns in Gujranwala District